El Cantón Cevallos is a canton of Ecuador, located in the Tungurahua Province.  Its capital is the town of Cevallos.  Its population at the 2001 census was 6,873.

References

Cantons of Tungurahua Province